Rattakul is a surname. Notable people with the surname include:

Bhichai Rattakul (1926–2022), Thai politician 
Bhichit Rattakul (born 1946), Thai politician

Thai-language surnames